"Estoy enamorado" (English: I'm in Love) is a song originally recorded by Donato y Estefano on their album Mar y Adentro in 1995. In 2009, Mexican singer Thalía covered the song and released the third single of the live album Primera fila and features with new Puerto Rican musician Pedro Capó. "Estoy Enamorado" was released as third official single in the United States, Mexico and Puerto Rico while in Argentina, Spain and Europe released "Enséñame a vivir" as third single. In 2014 Thalía release a Portuguese version of the song titled "Estou Apaixonado" in collaboration with Daniel.  The song served as the lead single for her 2014 Portuguese language album.

Commercial performance
The song topped the Mexican singles charts becoming a third consecutive hit for Thalía in her country.

Estou Apaixonado

"Estou Apaixonado " (English: I'm in Love) is the Portuguese version of the song recorded for Thalía's 2014 Brazilian released self titled album. The song was the album's lead single and had moderate airplay success in Brazil.

Charts

Certifications and sales

References

2010 singles
Monitor Latino Top General number-one singles
Pop ballads
Spanish-language songs
Thalía songs
Sony Music Latin singles
1995 songs
Live singles
Pedro Capó songs
Song recordings produced by Áureo Baqueiro